Volume 1 is the debut album of the band of Pará Banda Calypso. The album was produced by guitarist and husband of singer Joelma, Chimbinha, and released in mid-June 1999 by Calypso Productions.

Having reached more than five hundred thousand copies in Pará, Banda Calypso was invited to perform the song "Vendaval" in Programa Carlos Santos (being the first live performance of the band).

Development 
At the very beginning with good reputation as a producer and several contacts, Chimbinha had trouble getting sponsorship for the release of the first album of the band, there were those who believed in the band's work.

Finally, they managed a partnership that allowed a limited 1000 disc sales, which were sold out within a week. With this result, there were contracts for concerts and the band was expanding by Pará.

Singles
The album's first single was Vendaval, which had a very good acceptance by the public and Para in some regions of Northeast.

Even with the success of Vendaval, the song that really took the band to have a border spreading beyond of Belém was Disse Adeus, especially in the state of Pernambuco. It was the first song the band performed in the state.

But the most striking success of the album was Dançando Calypso, which became single the next album, Ao Vivo and was re-released on the 5th album, Ao Vivo em São Paulo. In addition to singles, the other songs on the album were also successful, but with better acceptance in their live versions.

Relaunching 
The album was re-released, and the only change made was the introduction of three bonus tracks: Loirinha,  Rubi and Brega Fó. In the song Loirinha, who acts is another singer called Dinho.

Nowadays, this is the album version found for more sales, download and research on the album.

Curiosities 
 Joelma says he made the album cover design, and it has posted 2 photos, but this made many think that there were two vocalists; Today the singer talks about the subject with humor.

Track listing

Bonus Tracks Second Edition

References

1999 debut albums
Banda Calypso albums